Forbidden Lover may refer to:

 "Forbidden Lover" (song), a 1998 single by L'Arc-en-Ciel
 The Power of Love (film), a silent film, aka Forbidden Lover
 Forbidden Lover, 1987 album Nancy Wilson discography

See also
Forbidden Love (disambiguation)